Javier Andrés Frelijj Vásquez (born 28 January 1991) is a Chilean handball player for CD Luterano and the Chile national team.

Individual achievements
2019 South and Central American Men's Club Handball Championship: Top scorer

References

1991 births
Living people
Chilean male handball players
Handball players at the 2015 Pan American Games
Handball players at the 2019 Pan American Games
Pan American Games silver medalists for Chile
Pan American Games bronze medalists for Chile
Pan American Games medalists in handball
Sportspeople from Valparaíso
Medalists at the 2015 Pan American Games
Medalists at the 2019 Pan American Games
21st-century Chilean people
South American Games silver medalists for Chile
South American Games medalists in handball
Competitors at the 2022 South American Games